Buscando América (Searching for America) is the first album by the Rubén Blades and Seis del Solar band released and distributed on April 3, 1984. The production, under the Elektra label, fuses different musical rhythms such as salsa, reggae, rock, and jazz Latin. The album was recorded at Eurosound Studios in New York between May and August 1983. 

With songs with political and social content and given their content of political questioning, some melodies had problems being broadcast on the radio; such as "Desapariciones", later reverted by other musicians. The album received a Grammy nomination for Best Tropical Latin Performance.

Production
The album was recorded with the six musicians of Seis Del Solar. The lyrics were printed inside the album in both Spanish and English.

Critical reception
The New York Times wrote that "the musicians, most of whom have labored for years on the salsa circuit, respond to Mr. Blades's creativity and risk-taking with some of the freshest, most impressive playing heard on a pop album this year." Trouser Press wote that Buscando América "stands as the finest of his major-label recordings to date."

Time named the album one of 1984's best.

Track listing

Staff 
Rubén Blades - vocals, acoustic guitar, maracas.

Seis Del Solar 
Mike Viñas: electric guitar, bass, backing vocals.

Oscar Hernandez: piano. 

Eddie Montalvo - drums, percussion. 

Louie Rivera: bongo, percussion, backing vocals.

Ralph Irizarry: timpani, percussion.

Ricardo Marrero: vibraphone.

Ray Adams – drums.

References

1984 albums
Elektra Records albums
Rubén Blades albums